Simone Bruni is an Italian-born Colombian footballer who currently plays for Boyacá Chicó. He plays as a defender and previously played for teams such as Deportivo Cali, A.S. Martina Franca 1947, Parma F.C. and most noticeably Inter Milan.

Career
Simone started off as a youth product of Deportivo Cali. He took part in the 2010 edition of the Copa Colombia where Cali eventually won. He then gained the interests of Inter Milan where he was an unused sub in the 2011 Supercoppa Italiana, where Inter lost to bitter rivals A.C. Milan. After one season, he was sold to Parma before being loaned out to low division club Martina Franca.

Honors

Deportivo Cali
Copa Colombia (1): 2010

Inter Milan
Supercoppa Italiana:
Runner Up (1): 2011

References

1993 births
Living people
Italian footballers
Colombian footballers
Colombia under-20 international footballers
Association football defenders
Deportivo Cali footballers
Inter Milan players
Parma Calcio 1913 players
L.R. Vicenza players
A.S. Martina Franca 1947 players
Boyacá Chicó F.C. footballers
Colombian expatriate footballers
Expatriate footballers in Colombia